Itaclytus is a genus of beetles in the family Cerambycidae, containing the following species:

 Itaclytus justini (Chevrolat, 1862)
 Itaclytus olivaceus (Laporte & Gory, 1835)
 Itaclytus tumulifer (Aurivillius, 1908)

References

Clytini